Delaware Avenue Methodist Episcopal Church, also known as Asbury-Delaware Methodist Church, is a historic Methodist Episcopal Church located at Buffalo in Erie County, New York.  It was constructed in two phases between 1871 and 1876 and is a distinct example of High Victorian Gothic ecclesiastical architecture. In 2006, the structure became home to Righteous Babe Records, and known as "The Church" or "Babeville".

It was listed on the National Register of Historic Places in 2003.

References

External links
 Asbury Delaware Avenue Methodist Church / Babeville, Buffalo as an Architectural Museum website

Churches on the National Register of Historic Places in New York (state)
Gothic Revival church buildings in New York (state)
Churches completed in 1876
19th-century Methodist church buildings in the United States
Churches in Buffalo, New York
National Register of Historic Places in Buffalo, New York